Hypophytala is a genus of butterflies in the family Lycaenidae. The species of this genus are endemic to the Afrotropical realm.

Species
Hypophytala benitensis (Holland, 1890)
Hypophytala henleyi (Kirby, 1890)
Hypophytala hyetta (Hewitson, 1873)
Hypophytala hyettina (Aurivillius, 1898)
Hypophytala hyettoides (Aurivillius, 1895)
Hypophytala nigrescens (Jackson, 1964)
Hypophytala obscura (Schultze, 1916)
Hypophytala reducta (Aurivillius, 1923)
Hypophytala ultramarina Libert & Collins, 1999
Hypophytala vansomereni (Jackson, 1964)

External links
"Hypophytala Clench in Fox, Lindsey, Clench & Miller, 1965" at Markku Savela's Lepidoptera and some other life forms

Poritiinae
Lycaenidae genera